Jesse Owens Memorial Stadium is a 10,000-capacity stadium located in Columbus, Ohio, United States. The stadium is home of the Ohio State Buckeyes men's and women's lacrosse teams as well as the soccer and track and field teams. The stadium opened for soccer in the fall of 2001. It also hosts the OHSAA boys and girls track and field State Tournament. It is named after former OSU athlete, Jesse Owens, with that honor transferred from the cinder track of Ohio Stadium, which then had football seating expanded over its footprint after the opening of this venue. Owens (September 12, 1913 – March 31, 1980) was an American track and field athlete and four-time Olympic gold medalist at the 1936 Games in Berlin, Germany.

Dimensions 
Soccer

Men's Lacrosse

Women's Lacrosse

Track & Field

References

Athletics (track and field) venues in Ohio
College lacrosse venues in the United States
College soccer venues in the United States
College track and field venues in the United States
Lacrosse venues in the United States
Ohio State Buckeyes sports venues
Ohio State Buckeyes track and field venues
Soccer venues in Ohio
Sports venues in Columbus, Ohio
Sports venues completed in 2001
University District (Columbus, Ohio)
2001 establishments in Ohio
Jesse Owens